KLGL (94.5 FM) is a radio station licensed to Salina, Utah and owned by Sanpete County Broadcasting Co. The station's format consists of modern adult contemporary music. KLGL is also heard on 10 translators throughout Utah.

References

External links
KLGL's website

LGL
Hot adult contemporary radio stations in the United States
Classic hits radio stations in the United States